Abdelaziz bin Khalifa bin Hamad bin Abdullah bin Jassim bin Muhammed Al Thani (born 12 December 1948) is a member of the royal family of Qatar, House of Thani.

Early life
Abdelaziz bin Khalifa is the first son of Khalifa bin Hamad Al Thani, the eighth Emir of Qatar, and eldest child of the Emir and his first spouse, Sheikha Amna bint Hassan bin Abdulla Al Thani. Sheikh Abdelaziz is the elder half-brother of Hamad, the former Emir of Qatar.

Career
Abdelaziz served as oil minister and minister of finance between 1972 and 1992.

Exile
After leaving office, Abdelaziz began to live in France. In a news article mentioning a foiled coup in 2011 he was supported by 66 opposition leaders including 16 Thani in 2011.

Quartet media reports that Abdelaziz is the head of the opposition.

Personal life
Abdelaziz married three times. The first marriage was with Sheikha Luluwah bint Jassim bin Hamad Al Thani, with whom he had six children. The second wife was Sheikha Aisha bint Nasser Al Suwaidi, with whom he had three children. His third wife was Kasia Gallanio, an American of Polish descent, whom he married in 2004 and had together three daughters. Gallanio, who was in a legal battle with her ex-husband Abdelaziz for 15 years over the custody of their children due to allegations of sexual assault against his eldest daughter, was found dead in Marbella, Spain on 29 May 2022, aged 45.

References

External links
 "SHEIKH ABDELAZIZ: Barclays settles claim" – Gulf States Newsletter

1948 births
Living people
Abdelaziz Bin Khalifa
Finance ministers of Qatar
Government ministers of Qatar
Qatari expatriates in France
Sons of monarchs